Palash is an upazila of the Dhaka Division of Bangladesh. It is the smallest upazila (sub-district) of Narsingdi District. Urban Palash is a part of Greater Dhaka; the conurbation surrounding the Bangladeshi capital city of Dhaka.

Geography
It has 31350 households and total area 94.43 km2. It borders Narsingdi Sadar to the south and Shibpur on the east and Rupganj, Kaliganj and Kapasia on the west. The Shitalakshya, Haridoa and Old Brahmaputra rivers all flow through it, totalling 60km of river water within Palash's boundaries.

History

During the Mughal period, the governor of Bengal granted Diwan Sharif ibn Munawwar Khan with the zamindari of Maheswardi Pargana. Diwan was the fifth descendant of Isa Khan, and married to Bibi Zaynab. The village of Sharifpur was named after him too. In 1714, Zaynab built a three-domed mosque in Sharifpur. The Brahmaputra River used to pass through modern-day Palash, and many sailboats would pass by Sharifpur. Due to this scenery, Sharifpur became known to locals as Parulia, from  pal uriya meaning flying sails in the Bengali language.

During the British rule, the area suffered greatly from the 1897 earthquakes. The Muslim zamindars of Ghorasal were a notable landowning family, either founded by Ghulam Nabi or Abu Yusuf Lutful Kabir Fenu Miah. Fenu Miah's son was Manu Miah, and other notable members of the family include Najmul Hasan and Maulvi Abdul Qadir. The Hindu Sahas were another notable zamindar family, who were based in Danga. The final zamindar was Lakkhan Saha who had three sons; Nikunja Saha, Perimohan Saha and Bangku Saha. Following the Partition of India in 1947 and the Bangladesh Liberation War in 1971, Bangku and Nikunja respectively migrated to India. Perimohan inherited the land and was succeeded by his only son, Bauddha Narayana Saha who sold the estate to Ahammad Ali, a Bengali Muslim wakil. A thana (police station) was founded at Palash in 1977. In 1980, the Khilpara Darul Ulum Alim Madrasa was established through the initiative of Abdul Aziz and Shafaz Uddin.

Demographic

According to the official 1991 census, Palash had a population of 174,040. Males constitute 53.4% of the population, and females 46.6%. This Upazila's eighteen up population is 89627. Palash has an average literacy rate of 88.6%  By 2011 that population had grown to 212,612, consisting of 46,780 households. Bengali Muslims form the majority, followed by Hindus, Buddhists and others.

Administration

Palash Upazila is divided into one municipality called Ghorasal in addition to four union parishads these are: Charsindur, Danga, Gazaria, and Jinardi. The union parishads are subdivided into 51 mauzas and 100 villages.

Ghorasal Municipality is subdivided into 9 wards and 51 mahallas.

Chairmens Of The Upazila

Economy and tourism
With access to the Shitalakshya River, Palash has three thermal power stations; one in Siddhirganj, one north of Ghorasal and one on the river bank. There are four bazaars in Palash which are in Ghorasal, Palash Bazar, Charsindur and Danga. Other than those, there are 25 smaller haat bazaars across the upazila. Danga is famed for loom production, Charsindur for bananas, Jinardi for pineapples and Mausum for fruits in general.

Palash is home to 92 eidgahs and 407 mosques, most notably the Miah Bari Mosque in Ghorasal and the Parulia Shahi Mosque complex which also contains the tombs of the former zamindar Diwan Sharif Khan and his wife Bibi Zaynab. The palaces in Danga of the former Saha family, the residence of RR Rubel Mullah and the Ghorasal zamindar estates are also popular tourist sites.

Infrastructure
The Palash Upazila has also built 6 orphanages which take care of orphan children and educate them. These include:
 Islampara Hafizia Orphanage & Madrasa
 Qazirchar Qaumi Orphanage & Madrasa
 East Qazirchar Rah-e-Jannat Hafizia Orphanage & Madrasa
 Jaynagar Dar us-Salam Orphanage & Madrasa
 Hasanhata Nurani Hafizia Orphanage & Madrasa
 Galimpur Hafizia Orphanage & Madrasa

Education

There are four colleges in the upazila. They include Palash Shilpanchal College. Urea Sar Karkhana School & College is one of two higher secondary schools.

According to Banglapedia, Charsindur High School, founded in 1919, Danga High School, Gayeshpur Padmalochan High School, Ghorashal High School (1945), Palash Thana High School, and Parulia High School (1933) are notable secondary schools.

The madrasa education system includes two fazil madrasas.

Notable people
 Ahmadul Kabir, politician and journalist
 Khayrul Kabir (1922-1997), founder of Jatiya Press Club, Pubali Jute Mills, Pakistan Arts Council and The Sangbad, former chairman of Janata Bank and Bangladesh Krishi Bank
 Haripada Datta, novelist
 Saroj Kumar Nath Adhikari, educationist
 Sheikh Golam Mohammed, Famous Mughal Man

by nusair and mamun also help.

See also
 Upazilas of Bangladesh
 Districts of Bangladesh
 Divisions of Bangladesh

References

Palash Upazila